Bellamya jeffreysi is a species of large freshwater snail with a gill and an operculum, an aquatic gastropod mollusc in the family Viviparidae.

This species is found in Malawi and Mozambique, in Lake Malawi. Its natural habitat is freshwater lakes. It is threatened by sedimentation and pollution. The only known conservation measure is that a small area of the lake is protected as a national park.

References

Viviparidae
Gastropods described in 1865
Taxonomy articles created by Polbot
Taxa named by Georg Ritter von Frauenfeld